Richard P. Hamada (born 1957/58) is an American businessman. He was CEO of Avnet, Inc. from July 4, 2011 to July 10, 2016. On July 11, 2016, Hamada stepped down as CEO and board member William Amelio was appointed as interim CEO.

References

1950s births
Living people
21st-century American businesspeople
Year of birth missing (living people)
San Diego State University alumni